John Gates (1913–1992) was an American Communist Party activist.

John Gates may also refer to:
John Gates (courtier) (1504–1553), English courtier, soldier and politician
John Gates (Portland mayor) (1827–1888), mayor of Portland, Oregon
John W. Gates (New York politician) (1872–1966), New York politician
John Warne Gates (1855–1911), promoter of barbed wire